Indigenous Norwegian Travellers (better known as Fantefolk or Skøyere) are an ethnic minority group in Norway. They are a wandering people who once travelled by foot, with horse-drawn carts and with boats along the southern and southwestern coastline of Norway. 

They are not to be confused with Romanisæl Travellers (also known as Tater, who are Norway and Sweden’s largest travelling group who have Romani roots and heritage).

Indigenous Norwegian Travellers have traditionally almost exclusively been centred around Southern Norway and the very southern parts of Southwestern Norway. They have managed to prevent their culture, language, identity, traditions and history from being absorbed up by the larger Romanisæl group of Norway due to being isolated from where they have historically travelled, as Romanisæl have traditionally travelled other parts of Norway, particularly Eastern Norway.

Origins
Similar to Indigenous Dutch Travellers, there is very little information on the history of Indigenous Norwegian Travellers, they may have mixed with the Yenish people and Romani people in the past, and have many Yenish and Romani loanwords in their language.

Names for the group
Known to the settled majority population as fant/fanter/fantefolk or skøyere, they prefer the term reisende ('travellers'). This term is also used by the Tater people (Romanisæl Travellers) (the largest population of Romani people in Norway and Sweden), though the two groups are distinct. There are also groups in German-speaking countries who refer to themselves as Reisende, which is German for 'travellers' as well.

Eilert Sundt, a 19th-century sociologist, termed the indigenous Travellers småvandrer or småvandringer ('small travellers’), to contrast them with the Romanisæl (Tater) Travellers, which Sundt called storvandrer or storvandringer (‘great travellers’) who ranged further in their journeys.

Language

The indigenous Norwegian Travellers used to speak their own language. This language was known as Rodi.  

Rodi has heavy lexical borrowings from German Rotwelsch as well as lexical borrowings from Romani too. The German Rotwelsch lexicon found within Norwegian Rodi is theorised to be from Yenish Travellers (German Travellers) migrating to Norway and mixing with indigenous Norwegian Travellers, it is also theorised that indigenous Norwegian Travellers are descended from Yenish Travellers who migrated to Norway centuries ago.  

The Romani lexicon found within Norwegian Rodi is not as prominent as German Rotwelsch lexicon. Romani lexicon is found in Norwegian Rodi because of the nearby Romanisæl (Tater) Travellers who live close by to the Indigenous Norwegian Travellers, also some Romani lexicon has come via Yenish Travellers, as their language (German Rotwelsch) has Romani lexical borrowings as well. There are mentions of Romanisæl Traveller-Indigenous Norwegian Traveller intermarriage, although despite this the two groups (along with their cultures, languages, traditions, identities and histories) have remained distinct. 

The morphology, syntax and grammar of the language is entirely Norwegian. Except for the lexicon of Romani and Rotwelsch origin, the language is entirely Nordic derived.

References

Further reading
 

Ethnic groups in Norway
Nomadic groups in Eurasia
Modern nomads
Nomadic ethnic groups in Modern Europe